Rafael Junior dos Santos Freire (born December 26, 1989 in Ourém), commonly known as Rafinha, is a Brazilian footballer who plays for Tuna Luso as midfielder. He already played for national competitions such as Copa do Brasil and Campeonato Brasileiro Série D for Santos–AP.

Career statistics

References

External links

1989 births
Living people
Brazilian footballers
Association football midfielders
Tuna Luso Brasileira players
Santos Futebol Clube (AP) players